John Field Lister (19 January 1916 – 23 August 2006) was an Anglican priest.

Early life and education
Lister was born on 19 January 1916. He was educated at King's School, Worcester, a private school in Worcester, Worcestershire. He studied theology at Keble College, Oxford, graduating with a Bachelor of Arts (BA) degree in 1938; and proceeded MA in 1942. In 1938, he entered Cuddesdon College, an Anglican theological college, to under a years training for ordained ministry.

Ordained ministry
Lister was ordained in the Church of England as a deacon in 1939 and as a priest in 1941. He was initially a Curate at St Nicholas Radford. After this he was Curate at St John the Baptist, Coventry and then Vicar of  Brighouse. He was Archdeacon of Halifax from 1961 to 1972, when he became Provost of Wakefield – a post he held for a decade. He retired from full-time ministry in 1982.

Later life
In retirement, from 1982 to 2003, Lister held Permission to Officiate in the Diocese of Canterbury. He died on 23 August 2006, aged 90.

References

1916 births
People educated at King's School, Worcester
Alumni of Keble College, Oxford
Alumni of Ripon College Cuddesdon
Archdeacons of Halifax
Provosts and Deans of Wakefield
2006 deaths